, also known as Kakara, is an island to the north of Yobuko, which is in the Higashimatsuura District of Saga Prefecture, Japan.
In 1884, it was reported that a cable had been laid between Korea and Japan, with an intermediate station on Kagara Island.
The island is a protected area for the vulnerable yellow bunting (Emberiza sulphurata).

References

Islands of Saga Prefecture